Windhausen is a village and a former municipality in the district of Göttingen, in Lower Saxony, Germany. Since 1 March 2013, it is part of the municipality Bad Grund.

Sights 
Protestant St. John's Church in the centre of Windhausen is a very unusual half-timbered building with a flèche covered with slate. There are many well-preserved half-timbered houses in the middle of the village. Close to the village, the impressive ruins of Windhausen Castle (Burg Windhausen) are worth a visit.

References 

Former municipalities in Lower Saxony